Kaelin Clay (born January 3, 1992) is a former American football wide receiver. He was drafted by the Tampa Bay Buccaneers in the sixth round of the 2015 NFL Draft and played college football at Utah.

Early years
Clay attended Long Beach Polytechnic High School in Long Beach, California. He caught 20 passes for 502 yards and six touchdowns in his junior season on a team that won the Southern Section title. He began his SuperPrep All-American and All-Moore League senior season as a wide receiver before moving to the backfield for the final four games. He rushed for 1,048 yards and posted another 524 receiving to combine for 1,572 rushing and receiving yards as a senior while scoring 15 touchdowns (eight receiving, seven rushings) and adding 13 punt returns for 206 yards. Clay was ranked as the No. 53 wide receiver nationally by Rivals.com and the media outlet's No. 79 player overall in the state of California.

Also a standout track & field athlete, Clay finished third in the state in the 100-meter dash (10.44) and fourth in the 200-meter dash (21.07) as a senior in 2010 with career-best times in both. He helped his track squad win Moore League titles in each his four seasons, while he was a four-time winner (100 meters, 200 meters, 4x100 meter relay, 4x400 meter relay) at the league track meet in each of his final two seasons, as well as the winner in both the 100m and 200m for each of his final three campaigns.

College career
Clay played one year at Utah after transferring from Mt. San Antonio College, where he was named first-team all-conference with 16 touchdowns. He made four different All-American teams as a return specialist in 2014 with Utah and was named first-team All-Pac-12 as a return specialist. He also finished the season with a punt return average of 15.0 and three touchdowns. Also returned a kickoff for a touchdown last season and had a 24.9 average on kickoff returns.

On November 8, 2014, Clay received national coverage when, with Utah up 7-0 against the Oregon Ducks, on what would have been Clay's defining 79-yard touchdown for his collegiate career, he celebrated prematurely and dropped the ball on the 1-yard line, allowing Oregon's Joe Walker to recover the ball and return it 99 yards for a touchdown in the opposite direction, changing the potential 14–0 score to a 7–7 tie; Oregon would go on to win the game 51–27.

Professional career

Tampa Bay Buccaneers
The Tampa Bay Buccaneers selected Clay in the sixth round of the 2015 NFL Draft with the 184th overall pick. On September 5, 2015, he was waived by the Buccaneers and was signed to the practice squad. On September 15, 2015, he was released by the Buccaneers.

Detroit Lions
On September 22, 2015, Clay was signed by the Lions to the practice squad.

Baltimore Ravens
On November 17, 2015, Clay was signed by the Ravens from the Lions' practice squad. On November 22, 2015, Clay played in his first career game against the St. Louis Rams. The next week against their divisional rival, Cleveland Browns, Clay returned the Browns’ first punt for an 82-yard touchdown on Monday Night Football.

During the August 11 preseason opener against the Carolina Panthers, Clay fumbled a punt, giving Carolina possession. He was waived/injured by the Ravens on August 15, 2016 and was placed on injured reserve. He was released from the Ravens' injured reserve list on November 11, 2016.

Carolina Panthers
On April 7, 2017, Clay signed a one-year contract with the Carolina Panthers.

Buffalo Bills
On September 2, 2017, Clay was traded to the Buffalo Bills for cornerback Kevon Seymour. He was waived by the Bills on October 23, 2017.

Carolina Panthers (second stint)
On October 24, 2017, Clay was claimed off waivers by the Panthers. On November 26, 2017, he returned a punt for a touchdown against the New York Jets. It was the second of his career.

Buffalo Bills (second stint)
On March 29, 2018, Clay signed with the Buffalo Bills. He was waived on September 1, 2018.

New York Giants
On September 1, 2018, Clay was claimed off waivers by the New York Giants. He was placed on injured reserve on September 25, 2018 after suffering a sprained ankle in Week 2. He was released on October 2, 2018.

Salt Lake Stallions
On December 22, 2018, Clay signed with the Salt Lake Stallions of the Alliance of American Football. He was placed on injured reserve on March 13, 2019. The league ceased operations in April 2019.

References

External links
 Baltimore Ravens bio
 Utah Utes bio

1992 births
Living people
Players of American football from Long Beach, California
American football wide receivers
American football return specialists
Mt. SAC Mounties football players
Utah Utes football players
Tampa Bay Buccaneers players
Detroit Lions players
Baltimore Ravens players
Carolina Panthers players
Buffalo Bills players
New York Giants players
Salt Lake Stallions players
Long Beach Polytechnic High School alumni